Branca of Portugal (1198 – Guadalajara, c. 1240;) was a Portuguese infanta (princess), eighth child of Portuguese King Sancho I and Dulce of Aragon, was probably the twin sister of Berengaria, she was raised in the court with her father and his mistress "a Ribeirinha" and, when she was eight or ten years old, was sent to live with her sisters at the Monastery of Lorvão. She was a nun at a convent in Guadalajara and was interred at the Monastery of Santa Cruz in Coimbra where her mother was buried.

Ancestry

References

Bibliography 

 

1198 births
1240 deaths
Dominican nuns
House of Burgundy-Portugal
Portuguese infantas
13th-century Portuguese  nuns
Daughters of kings